Richard Totten Button (born July 18, 1929) is an American former figure skater and skating analyst. He is a two-time Olympic champion (1948, 1952) and five-time consecutive World champion (1948–1952). He is also the only non-European man to have become European champion. Button is credited as having been the first skater to successfully land the double Axel jump in competition in 1948, as well as the first triple jump of any kind – a triple loop – in 1952. He also invented the flying camel spin, which was originally known as the "Button camel".

Early life
Button was born and raised in Englewood, New Jersey. He graduated in 1947 from the Englewood School for Boys (now Dwight-Englewood School). He began skating at an early age but did not begin training seriously until the age of 12, after his father overheard him being told he would never be a good skater.

Career

Amateur

Early competitions
In his first competition, the 1943 Eastern States Novice Championship, Button finished second to Jean-Pierre Brunet. In 1944, he won the Eastern States junior title which earned him the opportunity to compete at the National Novice Championships. He won the event. In 1945, his third year of serious skating, he won the Eastern States senior title and the national junior title. He was also skating pairs, and competed with Barbara Jones in junior pairs at the 1946 Eastern States Championships. They performed Button's singles program side-by-side with minor modifications and won. This competition, where Button also competed as a single skater, led into the 1946 U.S. Championships. At age 16, Button won the 1946 U.S. Championships by a unanimous vote. According to Button, this was the first time anyone had won the men's novice, junior, and senior titles in three consecutive years. This win earned Button a spot at the 1947 World Championships.

1947 World Championships
At the 1947 World Championships, Button was second behind rival Hans Gerschwiler following the compulsory figures part of the competition, with 34.9 points separating them. He won the free skating portion, but Gerschwiler had the majority of first places from the judges, three to Button's two. Button won the silver medal at his first World Championships. It was the last time he placed lower than first in competition. At the competition, Button was befriended by Ulrich Salchow. Salchow, who was disappointed when Button did not win, presented him with the first International Cup Salchow had won in 1901. Button later passed on this trophy to John Misha Petkevich following the 1972 Olympics and World Championships. Acknowledging that Gerschwiler had a better understanding of outdoor ice, Button decided to spend some time training outdoors on the Lake Placid club tennis courts.

1948 European Championships
Button faced Gerschwiler again at the 1948 European Championships. Button led after figures in points, having 749 points to Gerschwiler's 747.8, but Gerschwiler led in placings, with 14 to Button's 15. During the free skating, Button performed his Olympic program for the first time. He won, with 11 placings to Gerschwiler's 18. Following this year, when North Americans took home the men's and ladies' titles, non-Europeans were no longer allowed to enter into the European Championships. Button is the only American to have won the European Championships.

1948 Olympic Gold medal
At the 1948 Winter Olympics, Button led Gerschwiler by a 29.6 point lead following the figures portion of the competition, having won four of the five figures. Button had been attempting the double Axel jump in practice but had never landed it. In practice on the day before the free skating event, Button landed one in practice for the first time. He decided to put it into his free skating for the next day. Button landed it in competition, becoming the first skater in the world to do so. Button received eight firsts and two seconds, for a total of 10 places. Gerschwiler had 23. That combined with the figures results gave Button the gold medal.  He became, and remains, the youngest man to win the Olympic gold in figure skating. As of 2022, he remains the last living male winner of 1948 Winter Olympics.

1948 World Championships
Button went on to win the 1948 World Championships, where he faced Gerschwiler for the last time. Button won the event. At the time, the U.S. Championships were held after the World Championships, and Button finished his season by defending his national title. In February 1948, Button, his coach, and his mother were in Prague to perform an exhibition. They were stranded there after the Communist uprising and had to be extracted by the U.S. Army. In 1949, Button won the Sullivan Award as the outstanding amateur athlete in the United States. He is one of only two male figure skaters to win this award. Evan Lysacek is the other.

College years
Button had intended to attend Yale University beginning in the fall of 1947, but deferred a year due to the Olympics. Although he had originally been assured that his skating would not be a problem as long as his grades were good, he was later informed that he could not continue competing if he wanted to attend Yale. On advice from people from the Skating Club of Boston, Button applied to, and was accepted at, Harvard College. Button was a full-time student at Harvard while skating competitively and graduated in 1952 and was a member of The Delphic Club, one of the University's select "Final Clubs".

As reigning and defending champion, as well as being the first skater to perform a double Axel and a flying camel, Button was under pressure to perform a new jump or spin every season. In 1949, he performed a 2Lo-2Lo combination. He was the winner of the James E. Sullivan Award as the top U.S. amateur athlete of 1949, becoming the first figure skater to win the award. In 1950, he performed the 2Lo-2Lo-2Lo. In 1951, he performed a 2A-2Lo combination and a 2A-2A sequence. For the 1952 Winter Olympics, Button and Lussi began working on a triple jump. They settled on training the triple loop. Button landed it for the first time in practice in December 1951 at the Skating Club of Boston, and for the first time in exhibition in Vienna following the European Championships.

1952 Olympic Gold medal
At the 1952 Winter Olympics, Button had the lead after figures, with nine first places, over Helmut Seibt. Button's point total was 1,000.2 to Seibt's 957.7. During his free skating, Button successfully landed the triple loop, becoming the first person to complete a triple jump in competition. He became the third male figure skater to win two Olympic gold medals after Gillis Grafström and Karl Schäfer. He was the last man to defend his Olympic title in figure skating until Yuzuru Hanyu won his second Olympic gold in 2018. He repeated as Gold medalist, then went on to defend his titles at the 1952 World Figure Skating Championships and U.S. Championships.

Professional
Button decided to enter Harvard Law School in the fall of 1952. Because of the time commitments, Button retired from amateur skating that year to focus on law school. He completed a Bachelor of Laws (LL.B.) degree in 1956 and was admitted to the bar in Washington, D.C.

Following his retirement from competition, Button signed on to skate with the Ice Capades during his law school vacations. He toured with Holiday on Ice. He co-produced "Dick Button's Ice-Travaganza" for the 1964 New York World's Fair, starring 1963 World Champion Donald McPherson, but the ice show lost money and closed after a few months.

As founder of Candid Productions, he created a variety of made-for-television sports events, including the World Professional Figure Skating Championships, Challenge of Champions, Dorothy Hamill specials for HBO. As an actor, Button performed in such films as The Young Doctors and The Bad News Bears Go to Japan starring Tony Curtis. He appeared in television roles, including Hans Brinker and Mr. Broadway.

Button provided commentary for CBS's broadcast of the 1960 Winter Olympics, launching a decades-long career in television broadcast journalism. He did commentary for CBS's broadcast of the 1961 United States Figure Skating Championships. Beginning in 1962, he worked as a figure skating analyst for ABC Sports, which had acquired the rights to the United States Figure Skating Championships as well as the 1962 World Figure Skating Championships. During ABC's coverage of figure skating events in the 1960s, 1970s and 1980s, Button became the sport's best-known analyst, well known for his frank and often caustic appraisal of skaters' performances. He won an Emmy Award in 1981 for Outstanding Sports Personality – Analyst. Although other U.S. television networks aired the Winter Olympics from the 1990s onward, Button still appeared on ABC's broadcasts of the U.S. and World Figure Skating Championships until ABC removed them from its broadcast schedule in 2008.

During the 2006 Winter Olympics, Button appeared on loan from ABC to once again provide commentary on the Olympics. Also during the 2006 Winter Olympics, USA Network ran a show called Olympic Ice. A recurring segment, called "Push Dick's Button," invited viewers to send in questions which Button answered on the air. The segment proved very popular so ABC and ESPN put it into various broadcasts, most notably the 2006 Skate America, the 2007 United States Figure Skating Championships, and the 2007 World Figure Skating Championships. In late 2010, he was lead judge on Skating with the Stars, produced by BBC Worldwide, producers of Dancing with the Stars. In 2009, Button served as a judge on the CBC's Battle of the Blades reality show. He again appeared on NBC to do commentary for 2010 Games.

Personal life
Button's television skating debut came on We the People on April 11, 1952, when he skated on the rink at Rockefeller Center. He was a guest on the TV show I've Got A Secret as one of five former Olympic champions which aired October 13, 1954. In 1975, Button married figure skating coach Slavka Kohout; the couple later divorced. Button lives in North Salem, New York as of 2013. He was inducted into the World Figure Skating Hall of Fame in 1976, the same year it was founded.

Button suffered a serious head injury on July 5, 1978, when he was one of several men assaulted in Central Park by a gang of youths armed with baseball bats. Three persons were subsequently convicted of assault for the attacks. News accounts and trial testimony indicated the assailants were intending to target gay people, but the victims were attacked at random, and that because of the random nature of the attacks "... the police said there was no reason to believe the victims were homosexual."

On December 31, 2000, Button was skating at a public rink in New York State when he fell, fracturing his skull and causing a serious brain injury. He recovered and became a national spokesman for the Brain Injury Association of America as well as continuing his Emmy Award–winning commentary on broadcasts of the Olympic Games and on various figure-skating television shows.

Firsts
 First skater to land a double Axel
 First skater to land a triple jump (a triple loop)
 First male skater to perform the camel spin and inventor of the flying camel spin (also known as the Button Camel, after him)
 Only American to win the European title
 First American World Champion
 First American to win the Olympic title in figure skating
 First and only American back-to-back Olympic champion in figure skating
 First and only male skater to simultaneously hold all the following titles: National, North American, European, Worlds, and Olympics
 Youngest man to win the Olympic title in figure skating (age 18)

Results

See also
Canadian Professional Figure Skating Championships

References

External links

 
 
 
 

1929 births
Living people
Male actors from New Jersey
American male film actors
American male dancers
American male single skaters
American male television actors
Dwight-Englewood School alumni
European Figure Skating Championships medalists
Figure skating commentators
Figure skaters at the 1948 Winter Olympics
Figure skaters at the 1952 Winter Olympics
Harvard Law School alumni
James E. Sullivan Award recipients
Medalists at the 1948 Winter Olympics
Medalists at the 1952 Winter Olympics
Olympic figure skaters of the United States
Olympic Games broadcasters
Olympic gold medalists for the United States in figure skating
People from Englewood, New Jersey
Sports Emmy Award winners
World Figure Skating Championships medalists
People from North Salem, New York
Harvard College alumni